Nathaniel Coga, D.D. (b Veryan 1637 – d Cambridge 1693) was a 17th-century English academic:Master of Pembroke College, Cambridge  from 1677 until his death.

Coga entered Pembroke College, Cambridge in 1653. He graduated B.A. in 1657 and M.A. in 1660. He became a Fellow of Pembroke in 1671; and was appointed Junior Proctor later that year.  Coga held livings at Barton, Swaffham, Feltwell and Framlingham   He was also Chaplain to Matthew Wren.  He became Vice-Chancellor of the University of Cambridge in 1680, holding the office (as was customary at that time) for a year.

References

1637 births
1693 deaths
People from Cornwall
Vice-Chancellors of the University of Cambridge
Alumni of Pembroke College, Cambridge
Masters of Pembroke College, Cambridge
Fellows of Pembroke College, Cambridge
17th-century English Anglican priests